Jennie Kwan is an American television, film, and voice actress. She played Samantha "Sam" Woo on California Dreams, Satoko Hojo in Higurashi When They Cry, and voiced Suki, a character on Avatar: The Last Airbender.

Career
Kwan began acting at age 11 when she started performing with the touring company, "Kids of the Century". Her first television role was in 1991 as the voice of Audrey in Little Shop, a series based on the 1986 film Little Shop of Horrors.

She is best known as Samantha "Sam" Woo, a foreign exchange student from Hong Kong in the NBC sitcom California Dreams who first appeared in the show's second season. She joins the band as its keyboardist.

She competes on the twenty-fourth season of Worst Cooks in America, the show's seventh celebrity edition titled Thats So 90s, airing in April and May 2022.

Personal life
Kwan says she was often embarrassed in high school because despite being famous, she never had a boyfriend. She is married to Andrew Verona since 2012 and was married to Matthew Garrett, a local musician.

Filmography

Television

Film

Animation

Video games

References

External links

Living people

American television actresses
American video game actresses
American voice actresses
20th-century American actresses
21st-century American actresses
Place of birth missing (living people)
Year of birth missing (living people)